Pedro Espada Jr. (born October 20, 1953) is an American convicted felon and former politician. A Democrat, Espada served in the New York Senate.

Espada was at the center of a June 2009 power struggle in the State Senate. He was one of two Democratic senators who voted to appoint Republican Dean Skelos as Majority Leader. After his return to the Democratic caucus on July 9, 2009, Espada was chosen as Senate Majority Leader; he is the first Hispanic to have held that post. Dogged by scandals, he was defeated by Gustavo Rivera in a September 2010 primary election.

On December 14, 2010, Espada was indicted on six federal counts of embezzlement and theft; he was stripped of his leadership position in the State Senate the same day and left office in January 2011. Espada was convicted on federal corruption charges in May 2012 and was sentenced to five years in prison.

Early life and career
Espada was born in Coamo, Puerto Rico in 1953 and moved with his family to New York City at the age of five. His family settled in the Mott Haven section of the Bronx, where he attended the New York City Public Schools. He attended Fordham University, and graduated in 1975 with a Bachelor of Arts degree. Espada subsequently took graduate level coursework at the Hunter College School of Social Work, received graduate training certificates from open enrollment programs at the Wharton School of the University of Pennsylvania and from the Columbia Mailman School of Public Health, and received certification in 1990 from the Real Estate Institute at NYU's School of Continuing and Professional Studies.

In the late 1970s, Espada was a community organizer and educator in Harlem and the Lower East Side in Manhattan, and in the South Bronx. He established and served as president of the Comprehensive Community Development Corporation and was the executive director of the Soundview Health Center.

Espada had become head of the tenant's association at Stevenson Commons and led the effort in 1978 to open what became the Soundview Health Center after the city's economic problems led to a decision to not establish a promised clinic in the complex. The empty building that was to have been the clinic was leased by the group and $50,000 in federal grants was obtained, with the first patient taken in October 1981. By 1992, Soundview was offering medical and preventive care to 45,000 patients annually, and was also running a computer literacy program, serving lunch to hundreds of seniors daily and distributing surplus food. The New York Times noted that the health center featured Espada's name and image throughout the facility, describing it as having "elements of a cult of personality"; Espada explained, "the community has to know you" so that "in the end, they will trust you".

Political career
Espada, mounting a challenge against what would normally be a safe seat for renomination, made an issue of García's involvement in the Wedtech scandal, which resulted in the loss of 1,500 jobs in the economically challenged district. In the primary, Espada was endorsed by The New York Times, which called him "articulate, focused and knowledgeable about health and poverty" based on his experience with the Soundview Health Center and encouraged voters to "send a powerful message by supporting candidates who have been neither burned nor singed". Espada was also endorsed by El Diario and The Amsterdam News, but received few endorsements from political figures. García won renomination with 60 percent of the vote to Espada's 27 percent.

Espada was elected to represent the 32nd Senate District in the Southeast Bronx, which included the neighborhoods of Soundview, Hunts Point, Mott Haven and Parkchester. He served in office from 1993 to 1996 and again from 2001 to 2002, with David Rosado holding office in the intervening years.

In July 1996, the New York Observer reported that Espada did not live in the district when he ran for office and since he had been elected to the state legislature, in violation of New York State residency laws. He had moved to a house overlooking the Long Island Sound, "located on a cul-de-sac in a lushly green and exclusive neighborhood, only 16 miles from the South Bronx," in Mamaroneck, in Westchester County, the year before he ran for the State Senate, in 1991, according to Westchester County real estate records, reported the Manhattan-based weekly. When a reporter visited the house listed as the address for a car leased by the Medicaid-funded Comprehensive Community Development Corporation for the use of his wife, Connie, "Mr. Espada could be found lounging by the pool, dressed in a white tank-top and baby-blue shorts with a matching baseball cap."

Also in 1996, Espada was indicted for using $70,000 from a city-financed HMO to fund his unsuccessful reelection campaign.

When Espada's son, Pedro Gautier Espada, was elected to the New York State Assembly in 1996, the two became the first father and son in the New York State Legislature to represent different districts in the Bronx.

In the 1996 primary, the Bronx Democratic Party ran a candidate against Espada and successfully challenged his petitions in court. Espada ran on the Liberal Party line, and lost to David Rosado, 78% to 21%. In their 2000 rematch, Espada wrested the Democratic nomination from Rosado, who was forced to defend his seat in the Senate on the Liberal and Working Families Party lines. Espada, having the Democratic line, won the election handily.

In 2000, Espada was acquitted on charges of using $200,000 from a Soundview Health Management Organization to pay off campaign debts from 1996. He was found not guilty by arguing that the HMO was allowed to do as it wished with federal money. Four employees were found guilty of using taxpayer funds to help the campaigns of Espada and his son.

In 2001, Espada ran for Bronx Borough President, but was defeated by Adolfo Carrion Jr. in the Democratic primary election. Carrion received 48,913 votes, Espada received 44,124 votes, and June Margolin Eislan received 26,815 votes.

The State of New York pulled funding for some of Espada's nonprofits in 2002 due to "administrative deficiencies and apparent misuse of funds."

In 2002, Espada was defeated in a Democratic primary for his Senate seat. Incumbent City Councilmember Ruben Diaz, Sr. won that primary by 97 votes. Espada sought a new primary in court, but was denied.  He then ran unsuccessfully for his old seat on the Republican and Independence lines while remaining registered as a Democrat.

Espada was elected to the Senate in 2008 for a seat in the 33rd District, succeeding Efrain Gonzalez. The 33rd District is in the Northwest Bronx, including the neighborhoods of Bedford Park, Fordham, Norwood, and Kingsbridge Heights. At that time, he owed in excess of $60,000 in fines to the New York City Campaign Finance Board related to races as far back as his 2001 run for Bronx Borough President. The campaign for his 2008 State Senate run had not registered with the New York State Board of Elections and fines were assessed against Espada's 2000 Senate campaign for required reports that had not been filed. Espada acknowledged that mistakes had been made but insisted that some of the accusations were unfair.

Espada voted in favor of same-sex marriage legislation on December 2, 2009, but the bill was defeated.

June 2009 leadership crisis

Though there were 32 Democrats and 30 Republicans in the Senate, on June 8, 2009, Espada and Hiram Monserrate (D-Queens) were part of what was described by the Associated Press as a "parliamentary coup" and voted with the 30 Republican members to install Senator Dean Skelos (R-Nassau) as the new majority leader of the Senate, replacing Senator Malcolm Smith (D-Queens). In a press release posted to his Senate web page, Espada emphasized that "I remain a staunch, reform Democrat. I have not switched parties," and that his actions were intended to help end the "gridlock, paralysis, secretiveness, threats and partisan politics" that the Senate had experienced in the previous months and that he was not part of "a power grab or a coup" but was working to build a coalition to serve the needs of all New Yorkers with open and transparent government. However, when pressed by Wayne Barrett on June 11, 2009, as to whether he felt allegiance to the Democratic party, the Senator claimed he owed nothing to a political party that spent "hundreds of thousands" to defeat his past elections.

The switch was preceded by several weeks of private talks brokered by upstate billionaire Tom Golisano.

In the early evening of July 9, 2009, Espada switched his allegiance back with the Democratic Party, and was then selected the Senate Majority Leader of the New York State Senate. He is the first Hispanic to have held that post.

2009-2010 investigations and legal difficulties
Espada claimed a co-op apartment in Bedford Park as his district residence. Several residents of the Bronx co-op said they never saw him there. The Bronx County District Attorney opened an investigation in 2009.

In 2009, New York State Attorney General Andrew Cuomo investigated Espada's use of the Soundview Health Clinic for personal political reasons. Clinic offices also advertised Espada's name on the front canopy, displayed campaign posters on clinic grounds, and displayed posters of Espada surrounded by smiling children.

In 2010, Espada was investigated by federal investigators and the IRS for his ties with a consulting firm called "A-1 Multi-Service LLC" over suspicions that the firm, which appeared to not have a valid office, might be a shell company for tax fraud and money laundering.

On April 20, 2010, Cuomo sued Espada for siphoning $14 million from the Soundview Health Clinic for personal expenses. The lawsuit covered five years of spending, which included $80,000 in restaurant bills (which included $20,000 in sushi delivered to Espada's Mamaroneck home), personal trips including to Las Vegas and Puerto Rico, and renting a residence required to establish residency in the district for his Senate race in 2008. The lawsuit also sought to remove Espada from the board of directors of Soundview and replace the board, which Cuomo characterized as being "packed with family and friends that Mr. Espada could control directly and indirectly."

Federal and IRS agents raided two of Espada's offices in the Bronx on April 21, 2010  and his office records were subpoenaed the following day.

On April 24, 2010, Espada walked out of the taping of an interview with reporter Marcia Kramer of WCBS-TV after issues of his actual residence was revisited. Espada got testy when Kramer reminded him that when she approached him last year outside his Mamaroneck home, he donned an orange ski cap and held a baby in front of his face to hide from the camera before speeding off in a car driven by his wife Connie Espada.

On April 29, 2010, Espada was hit with a civil lawsuit for allegedly pocketing $1.35 million in a sham job training program. The suit focused on "Espada Management Company", a company run by Espada's son and the company that was hired to provide janitorial services for Espada's Soundview Health Clinics. According to the suit, Espada paid the trainees below minimum wage — as little as $1.70/hr — to mop floors and scrub toilets.

During a later interview conducted by Diana Williams on WABC-TV, Espada's defense was characterized as turning personal against Andrew Cuomo. Espada repeatedly called Attorney General Cuomo the "Prince of Darkness" and claimed Cuomo's success to be because of the success of his father, former New York governor Mario Cuomo.

Several state senators—including fellow Democrats Neil Breslin, Darrel Aubertine, and David Valesky—called for Espada to step down from his Senate leadership positions. State Senator Martin Golden of Brooklyn also introduced an amendment to force Espada from his majority leader position. Nassau County District Attorney Kathleen Rice said that Espada could not lead anymore amid the investigations against him. State Senator Eric Schneiderman also called for Espada to not only step down from his senate position, but also forfeit his stipend.

On June 9, 2010, residents from the 33rd Bronx Senate district, which Espada represented, descended upon Espada's out-of-district Mamaroneck home in Westchester County to protest for his ousting.

2010 re-election campaign
Despite being under investigation by the Bronx District Attorney, the FBI, the IRS, and the New York State Attorney General, Espada ran for re-election to his 33rd State Senate District seat. He was challenged by a number of candidates, including (José) Gustavo Rivera. The New Roosevelt Initiative, an independent expenditure group led by Bill Samuels, pledged to donate $250,000 to a candidate who sought to defeat Espada.

The New York State Democratic Committee launched efforts to oust Espada from the party. The week of July 5, the Committee sent a letter to Bronx party leaders calling for the cancellation of Espada's membership. They said Espada did not support party goals because he had joined with Republicans the previous summer in the power play that ground Senate business to a halt for a month. In response, on July 12, 2010, Espada claimed that the charges against him were filed due to racism. Espada said, "If you look brown and you're an immigrant, you're not supposed to have power". Furthermore, Espada proclaimed, "I have God on my side!"

On August 9, 2010, two major labor unions — the 1199 SEIU and 32BJ — endorsed Espada's opponent for the 33rd district seat.

Espada lost the primary election to Gustavo Rivera on September 14, 2010, 32.66% to 62.21%. In his concession speech, Espada blamed unions, outside influence, and the media for his defeat. Espada also refused to call primary winner Rivera personally.

Indictment, demotion, conviction, and aftermath
On December 14, 2010, Espada and his son, Pedro Gautier Espada, were indicted on six federal counts of embezzlement and theft. The indictment was by U.S. Attorney Loretta E. Lynch, and also announced by New York State Attorney General and Governor-elect Andrew Cuomo. According to Cuomo, the Espadas embezzled public money for personal use, including purchases of food, Broadway show tickets, and a down payment for a Bentley car. They faced up to 55 years in prison if convicted of all charges.

The same day Espada was indicted, he was stripped of his title and position as Senate Majority Leader. He left office in January 2011.

On May 14, 2012, after 11 days of deliberation, a federal jury found Espada guilty of embezzling money from federally funded healthcare clinics. Espada was sentenced to five years in prison.

Espada served his prison sentence in the Metropolitan Detention Center in Brooklyn, New York, and complained about the conditions at the facility while incarcerated. Espada's prisoner number was 78764-053 and he was released on October 30, 2017.

See also
 2009 New York State Senate leadership crisis
 List of minority governors and lieutenant governors in the United States

References

External links

Notes

1953 births
Living people
People from Coamo, Puerto Rico
Hispanic and Latino American state legislators in New York (state)
Democratic Party New York (state) state senators
Majority leaders of the New York State Senate
New York City Council members
Hispanic and Latino American New York City Council members
Fordham University alumni
People from Mamaroneck, New York
New York (state) politicians convicted of corruption
New York (state) politicians convicted of crimes
Columbia University Mailman School of Public Health alumni
21st-century American politicians
Politicians from the Bronx